was a village located in Yamabe District, Nara Prefecture, Japan.

As of 2003, the village had an estimated population of 6,712 and a density of 152.93 persons per km². The total area was 43.89 km².

On April 1, 2005, Tsuge, along with the village of Tsukigase (from Soekami District), was merged into the expanded city of Nara.

Dissolved municipalities of Nara Prefecture
Populated places disestablished in 2005
2005 disestablishments in Japan